This is a table of skeletal muscles of the human anatomy.

There are around 650 skeletal muscles within the typical human body. Almost every muscle constitutes one part of a pair of identical bilateral muscles, found on both sides, resulting in approximately 320 pairs of muscles, as presented in this article. Nevertheless, the exact number is difficult to define. Different sources group muscles differently, regarding what is defined as different parts of a single muscle or as several muscles. There are also vestigial muscles that are present in some people but absent in others, such as palmaris longus muscle.

The muscles of the human body can be categorized into a number of groups which include muscles relating to the head and neck, muscles of the torso or trunk, muscles of the upper limbs, and muscles of the lower limbs.

The action refers to the action of each muscle from the standard anatomical position. In other positions, other actions may be performed.

These muscles are described using anatomical terminology. The term "muscle" is omitted from muscle names (except when a muscle is an origin or insertion), and the term "bone" is omitted from bone names. The terms "artery" and "nerve" are both used when these structures are mentioned.

Head

Forehead/eyelid

Extraocular muscles

Ear

Nose

Mouth

Mastication

Tongue

Extrinsic

Intrinsic

Soft palate

Pharynx

Larynx

Neck

Clavicular

Suprahyoid

Infrahyoid

Neck

Anterior

Lateral

Posterior

Torso

Abdomen

Back

Chest

Pelvis

Perineum

Upper limb

Vertebral column

Thoracic walls

Shoulder

Arm

Anterior compartment

Posterior compartment

Forearm

Anterior compartment

Superficial

Deep

Posterior compartment

Superficial

Deep

Hand

Lateral volar

Thenar

Medial volar

Intermediate

Lower limb

Iliac region

Gluteal

Thigh

Anterior compartment

Posterior compartment/hamstring

Medial compartment

Leg

Anterior compartment

Posterior compartment

Superficial

Deep

Lateral compartment

Foot

Dorsal

Plantar

First layer

Second layer

Third layer

Fourth layer

Innervation overview

See also 
 Accessory muscle
 List of bones of the human skeleton
 List of nerves of the human body
 Circulatory system
 Blood vessel

References

General references

External links 
 LUMEN's Master Muscle List from www.meddean.luc.edu
 The Hosford Muscle Tables for the Human Body from PT Central
 Lower Extremity Muscle Atlas from rad.washington.edu
 Tutorial and quizzes on skeletal muscular anatomy
 Muscles of human body (also here)
Anatomy quiz

Muscular system
Muscles